The Knife River is a tributary of the Missouri River in the US state of North Dakota.

Knife River may also refer to:

Rivers
 Knife River (Lake Superior), a tributary of Lake Superior, in Minnesota, US
 Knife River (Snake River tributary), in Minnesota, US
 Knife River (Minnesota–Ontario), US and Canada
 North Knife River and South Knife River, Manitoba, Canada; see List of rivers of the Americas by coastline § Arctic Ocean coast

Places
 Knife River, Minnesota
 Knife River, Montana

Other
 Knife River Indian Villages National Historic Site, North Dakota
 Knife River Corporation, a construction materials company owned by MDU Resources

See also 
 Little Knife River (disambiguation)